Grey Abbey may refer to:

Monasteries 

 Grey Abbey, Down a 12th century Cistercian monastery in County Down, Northern Ireland
 Grey Abbey, Kildare a 13th century Franciscan monastery in County Kildare, Republic of Ireland

Human settlements 

 Greyabbey, a town in County Down, Ireland